Yellowstone is a brand of Kentucky Straight Bourbon Whiskey. It is distilled by the Limestone Branch Distillery in Lebanon, Kentucky.

History 
In 1872, Yellowstone was the name given to an 1854 brand  of Kentucky Bourbon produced by the J. B. Dant Distillery (Cold Springs Distillery, Gethsemani, Kentucky).

Yellowstone Bourbon was started by J. B. Dant (son of J. W. Dant) who teamed up with D. H. Taylor and J. T. Williams to found the Yellowstone Distillery and its brand (named after the Yellowstone National Park) sometime in the 1880s. The Glenmore Distillery Company of Owensboro, Kentucky, bought the distillery in 1944 and operated it for several decades.

In 1920, Yellowstone Bourbon was bottled for "medicinal purposes only" during Prohibition.

In the 1960s, Yellowstone was the largest selling brand in Kentucky.

Scotland-based United Distillers & Vintners, which was part of Guinness (and later became Diageo in 1997), bought Glenmore in 1991 and promptly shut it down and sold off the Ezra Brooks and Yellowstone brands to the David Sherman Company, which continued to produce both brands. Sherman later approached Heaven Hill about distilling bourbon for the brand and aging it in their Kentucky warehouses. It was then shipped to St. Louis in oak barrels where it was bottled and distributed. 

In 1993, the Yellowstone Bourbon brand was sold to Heaven Hill and the distillery was sold to Florida Distillers (now part of Imperial Brands, owned by Belvédère). The brand was immediately re-sold to the David Sherman Company, which was later renamed as Luxco. However, Luxco contracted the brand's production process to Heaven Hill.

In 2006, the David Sherman Company rebranded itself to Luxco as a tribute to one of its co-founders, Paul Lux, and as a reflection of the current ownership of the company.

In 2010, Paul and Steve Beam, descendants of J. W. Dant and the Beam family, founded the Limestone Branch Distillery company. In the spring of 2015, they formed a business partnership with Luxco. The brand is distilled and aged in Kentucky and is bottled in Lebanon, Kentucky.

In popular culture

Yellowstone Whiskey appears in the 2022 movie Father Stu.

References

Bourbon whiskey
Lebanon, Kentucky